The 2013–14 Robert Morris Colonials men's basketball team represented Robert Morris University during the 2013–14 NCAA Division I men's basketball season. The Colonials, led by fourth year head coach Andrew Toole, played their home games at the Charles L. Sewall Center and were members of the Northeast Conference. They finished the season 22–14, 14–2 in NEC play to win the regular season NEC championship. They advanced to the championship game of the NEC tournament where they lost to Mount St. Mary's. As a regular season conference champion who failed to win their conference tournament, they earned an automatic bid to the National Invitation Tournament. In the NIT, they defeated St. John's in the first round before losing in the second round to Belmont.

Roster

Schedule

|-
!colspan=9 style="background:#14234B; color:#B01F2E;"| Exhibition

|-
!colspan=9 style="background:#14234B; color:#B01F2E;"| Regular season

|-
!colspan=9 style="background:#14234B; color:#B01F2E;"| Northeast Conference tournament

|-
!colspan=9 style="background:#14234B; color:#B01F2E;"| NIT

References

Robert Morris Colonials men's basketball seasons
Robert Morris
Robert Morris
Robert
Robert